Samuel Charles (born December 2, 1985) is an American football wide receiver for the Iowa Barnstormers of the Indoor Football League (IFL). He played college football at  Edward Waters College.

College career
Charles continued his football career at Edward Waters College. As a sophomore in 2009, Charles was named 2nd Team All-NAIA Independent.

Professional career

Wyoming Cavalry
In 2014, Charles signed with the Wyoming Cavalry of the Indoor Football League (IFL). After an impressive rookie season, Charles was named 2nd Team All-IFL.

Spokane Shock
Charles was assigned to the Spokane Shock of the Arena Football League (AFL) for the remainder of the 2014 season. The Shock picked up Charles' rookie option for 2015. In the Shock's first game of the season, Charles caught his first two passes of his AFL career for 14 yards. He was placed on reassignment on May 18, 2015, and after clearing waivers, was assigned the Shock on May 20, 2015. On August 23, 2016, Charles re-signed with the Spokane Empire.

Jacksonville Sharks
Charles signed with the Jacksonville Sharks of the National Arena League (NAL) for the 2018 season.

References

External links
Arena Football bio

Living people
1985 births
American football wide receivers
Wyoming Cavalry players
Spokane Shock players
Players of American football from Miami
Hialeah-Miami Lakes Senior High School alumni
Edward Waters Tigers football players
Spokane Empire players
Jacksonville Sharks players
Iowa Barnstormers players